The 2009–10 Iranian Futsal 1st Division will be divided into two phases, the regular season, played from 13 November 2009.

The league will also be composed of 16 teams divided into two divisions of 8 teams each, whose teams will be divided geographically. Teams will play only other teams in their own division, once at home and once away for a total of 14 matches each.

Teams

Group A

Group B 

1 Fakhr Aluminium Arak terminated their sports activities due to financial problems. Saman Saz Arak took over their license.

League standings

Group A

Group B

Results table

Group A

Group B

Play-off 

Persepolis Promoted to the Super League.

First leg

Return leg

Arash Beton Qazvin Promoted to the Super League.

First leg

Return leg

See also 
 2009–10 Iranian Futsal Super League
 2010 Iran Futsal's 2nd Division
 2009–10 Persian Gulf Cup
 2009–10 Azadegan League
 2009–10 Iran Football's 2nd Division
 2009–10 Iran Football's 3rd Division
 2009–10 Hazfi Cup
 Iranian Super Cup

References

External links 
   فوتسال نیوز 
  I.R. Iran Football Federation

Iran Futsal's 1st Division seasons
2009–10 in Iranian futsal leagues